Antje Beitske "Anneke" Mulder-Bakker (born 7 April 1940) is a historian at the University of Groningen who is a specialist in the position of women during the Middle Ages. She writes mainly in Dutch.

Selected English language publications
The Invention of Saintliness, Routledge, 2002. 
Seeing and Knowing: Women and Learning in Medieval Europe, 1200-1550, Brepols, 2004. (Medieval Women: Texts and Contexts) 
Lives of the Anchoresses: The Rise of the Urban Recluse in Medieval Europe, (Myra Heerspink Scholz, translator), University of Pennsylvania Press, Philadelphia, 2005. 
Women and Experience in Later Medieval Writing: Reading the Book of Life, Palgrave Macmillan, 2009.

References 

1940 births
Living people
Dutch medievalists
Women medievalists
Dutch women historians
University of Groningen alumni
Women's historians